The largest seed in the world is the coco de mer, the seed of a palm tree.

List

Other recorded largest seeds include:

See also
List of world records held by plants
List of largest inflorescences
List of superlative trees
Seed
Seedbed

References

External links
Coco de Mer Cerf Island

Plant morphology
Seeds
Lists of plants